Dikilitaş (also known as Bekirde) is the name of a rock monument and a neighbourhood of Mersin, Turkey named after the monument.

Geography
Both the settlement and the monument are in Mersin municipality area. The settlement is situated slightly to the north of the monument.

History
In Turkish Dikilitaş means obelisk. Dikilitaş in Mersin was a triumph monument and it was erected by the Assyrian king Sennacherib after his victory against Dorians in 696 BC. When erected, the monument was on the ancient road to Tarsus and probably it was in the urban fabric of the ancient city of Anchiale.

Up to 2004, the settlement of Dikilitaş was a village named Bekirde After 2004 it was included in the metropolitan municipality of Mersin as a neighbourhood of the city. It was renamed after the monument.

Technical details
Its marble cover (and possibly the sculpture on the monument) since had been ruined.

A legend
According to a popular legend  there were two struggling families one in Tarsus and the other in Silifke. The families made peace and the daughter of the Tarsus family and the son of the Silifke family got married. But after the bride’s brother died because of natural causes in Silifke, the head of the Silifke family travelled to Tarsus to give the bad news. However, before reaching to Tarsus he met with the head of the Tarsus family on the spot where the monument is. The monument was erected by the sad father.

References

Tourist attractions in Mersin
Archaeological sites in Mersin Province, Turkey
Obelisks in Turkey